The Janis Rozentāls Art School (JRMS) is a Latvian art school teaching the academic arts of drawing, painting and composition — as well as graphics and design.

The art high school has its beginning in 1895, when the Latvian Painters Society established a painter's school. In 1928 the school changed its name to Latvian Painters Crafts Promotion and Relief Society Vocational School, which again was changed in 1944 to Riga Secondary School of Art, in 1946 to Janis Rozentāls Art High School, in 1998 to Janis Rozentāls Art College, on 18 March 2002 to Janis Rozentāls Riga Art High School.

References

External links 
 

Art schools in Latvia
Education in Riga
Educational institutions established in 1895
Arts organizations established in 1895
1895 establishments in the Russian Empire